The 2012–13 Deutsche Eishockey Liga season was the 19th season since the founding of the Deutsche Eishockey Liga.

Teams

Regular season

GP = Games Played, W = Wins, OTW = Overtime win, SOW = Shootout win, OTL = Overtime loss, SOL = Shootout loss, L = Loss
Color code:  = Direct Playoff qualification,  = Playoff qualification round,  = No playoff

Playoffs

Playoff qualification
The playoff qualification was played between March 13 and 17, 2013 in a Best-of-three mode.

Thomas Sabo Ice Tigers vs. EHC Wolfsburg

Augsburger Panther vs. Straubing Tigers

Bracket
There was a reseeding after the first round.

Quarterfinals
The quarterfinals were played between 20 March and 1 April 2013 in a Best-of-seven mode.

Adler Mannheim vs. EHC Wolfsburg

Kölner Haie vs. Straubing Tigers

Krefeld Pinguine vs. ERC Ingolstadt

Eisbären Berlin vs. Hamburg Freezers

Semifinals
The semifinals were played between 3 and 12 April 2013 in a Best-of-five mode.

Kölner Haie vs. EHC Wolfsburg

Krefeld Pinguine vs. Eisbären Berlin

Final
The final were played between 14 and 24 April 2013 in a Best-of-five mode.

Kölner Haie vs. Eisbären Berlin

References

External links
Official League Website

DEL season
Ger
2012-13